The 1988 Sunkist Fiesta Bowl was the 17th edition of the college football bowl game played at Sun Devil Stadium in Tempe, Arizona on Friday, January 1. Part of the 1987–88 bowl game season, it matched the third-ranked independent Florida State Seminoles and the #5 Nebraska Cornhuskers of the Big Eight Conference. Favored Florida State rallied to win 31–28.

Teams

Florida State

Nebraska

Game summary
Kickoff was just after 11:30 a.m.  and underdog Nebraska scored first on a three-yard run by senior halfback Keith Jones with 9:31 left in the first quarter. With 1:15 left in the opening stanza, Dana Brinson fielded a punt and returned it 52 yards for a touchdown and Nebraska 

Florida State got on the board in the second quarter when quarterback Danny McManus threw a 10-yard touchdown pass to Herb Gainer. With under five minutes left in the first half, running back Dayne Williams scored from four  yards out to tie the game at fourteen. With 44 seconds left in the half, McManus connected with Gainer on a 25-yard touchdown pass, marking their second hook-up of the game, and the Seminoles took a  advantage into halftime.

Just over three minutes into the third quarter, Nebraska quarterback Steve Taylor notched the equalizer, rumbling in from two yards out to tie the game at 21. Florida State settled for a field goal for a  lead. With forty seconds left in the quarter, running back Tyreese Knox scored on a four-yard run, giving Nebraska a 

In the fourth quarter, Nebraska got the ball back on its 26-yard line. Following a methodical drive, they managed to move all the way to the FSU two-yard line for a first and goal. Knox took the handoff, looking for a sure touchdown, when a defender forced a fumble at the goal line, recovered by Florida State. Ten plays later, Florida State had advanced to the Nebraska 15 and McManus threw a touchdown pass to Ronald Lewis for the clinching

Scoring
First quarter
Nebraska – Keith Jones 3-yard run (Chris Drennan kick), 9:31
Nebraska – Dana Brinson 52-yard punt return (Drennan kick), 1:15
Second quarter
Florida State – Herb Gainer 10-yard pass from Danny McManus (Derek Schmidt kick), 10:53
Florida State – Dayne Williams 4-yard run (Schmidt kick), 3:48
Florida State – Gainer 25-yard pass from McManus (Schmidt kick), 0:46
Third quarter
Nebraska – Steve Taylor 2-yard run (Drennan kick), 11:41
Florida State – Schmidt 32-yard field goal, 7:49
Nebraska – Tyreese Knox 4-yard run (Drennan kick), 0:40
Fourth quarter
Florida State – Ronald Lewis 15-yard pass from McManus (Schmidt kick), 3:07

Statistics
{| class=wikitable style="text-align:center"
! Statistics !! FloridaState !!  Nebraska 
|-
|align=left|First Downs || 26 || 20
|-
|align=left|Rushes–yards|| 29–82|| 54–242
|-
|align=left|Passing yards || 375 || 142
|-
|align=left|Passes || 28–51–1 || 7–14–1
|-
|align=left|Total yards || 457 || 384
|-
|align=left|Punts–average ||4–30|| 4–36
|-
|align=left|Fumbles–lost ||2–1|| 4–2
|-
|align=left|Turnovers by||2||3
|-
|align=left|Penalties-yards ||2–20|| 9–78
|-
|align=left|Time of possession ||31:07||28:53
|}

Aftermath
Florida State climbed to second in the final AP poll and Nebraska fell

References

External links
http://huskerpedia.com/games/1987/12floridastate.html

Fiesta Bowl
Fiesta Bowl
Florida State Seminoles football bowl games
Nebraska Cornhuskers football bowl games
January 1988 sports events in the United States
1988 in sports in Arizona